The Emory National Primate Research Center (formerly known as Yerkes National Primate Research Center) located in Atlanta, Georgia, owned by Emory University, is a center of biomedical and behavioral research, is dedicated to improving human and animal health, and is the oldest of seven National Primate Research Centers partially funded by the National Institutes of Health.  It is known for its nationally and internationally recognized biomedical and behavioral studies with nonhuman primates by Emory University.

Its  Main Station contains most of the center's biomedical research laboratories. The center also includes the Living Links Center and the  Field Station near Lawrenceville, Georgia.

History
The center was established in 1930 by Robert Yerkes, in Orange Park, Florida, associated then with Yale University. Yerkes was a pioneering primatologist who specialized in comparative psychology.

In 1965, it relocated to its location on the campus of Emory University.

In April 2022, Emory University removed Yerkes’ name from the center, after a review by Emory's Committee on Naming Honors recommended that the name be changed due to Yerkes' past support for eugenics. The Yerkes National Primate Research Center will be known as the Emory National Primate Research Center, effective June 1, 2022.

Satellite locations

The Living Links Center is a part of the Emory National Primate Research Center and is run by primatologist Frans De Waal. Located at the center's Main Station on the Emory campus, work is also carried out at the Field Station.

Research
Multidisciplinary medical research at the research center is primarily aimed at development of medical treatments and vaccines.  Research programs include cognitive development and decline, childhood visual defects, organ transplantation, the behavioral effects of hormone replacement therapy and social behaviors of primates.  Researchers also are leading programs to better understand the aging process, pioneer organ transplant procedures and provide safer drugs to organ transplant recipients, determine the behavioral effects of hormone replacement therapy, prevent early onset vision disorders and shed light on human behavioral evolution. Researchers have had success creating transgenic rhesus macaque monkeys with Huntington's disease and hope to breed a second generation of macaques with the genetic disorder.

Controversy and incidents
The center has long been the target of protest for its treatment of animals. This was especially true after the release of Frederick Wiseman's 1974 film Primate, which was shot at the research center and depicted primates undergoing surgical procedures, as well as a transcardial perfusion and brain extraction.

The center's proposal to do AIDS-related research on endangered sooty mangabey monkeys drew opposition from numerous primatologists, including Jane Goodall.

Emory National Primate Research Center research assistant Elizabeth Griffin became the first work-related death in the center's history on December 10, 1997, due to herpes B virus. Griffin apparently became infected after a fluid exposure to the eye which occurred while helping to move a caged rhesus macaque at the Field Station. The Occupational Safety and Health Administration ultimately fined the center $105,300 in 1998 after a 19-week investigation. The event led to reforms in safety protocols for handling research primates.

On June 15, 2011, at the Field Station, personnel determined that Ep13, a non-infected female rhesus macaque, was missing. On August 16, 2011, the search for Ep13 ended.

In December 2014, a macaque was found dead in an enclosure adjacent to the one in which she was supposed to be housed. Staff at the facility failed to notice that the macaque was not in the correct enclosure.

In January 2015, a macaque was euthanized after being in distress for at least two weeks. A necropsy revealed that the macaque was in distress because staff had applied a rubber band to the animal during application of an identification tattoo, but had failed to remove the rubber band.

In December 2015, a male macaque was euthanized after being sick from surgery a week prior. A necropsy revealed that the macaque was sick as a result of a piece of gauze being left in his abdomen during surgery, which causing adhesions and intestinal obstruction.

In July 2017, a primate was mistakenly euthanized after a technician mistakenly entered the wrong code into the euthanization schedule.

In August 2017, a primate had to be given surgery after a gauze sponge was left in its abdomen from a different surgery a week prior.

In August 2021, a female macaque died after her leg got caught in a gap in the wall of her housing facility. An investigation determined that the housing facility was not constructed properly.

In October 2021, the USDA reported that the center had not properly cleaned food waste from several macaque housing enclosures. It was reported that food waste had not been cleaned up for three to four weeks. In some cases, the accumulation of food waste prevented drainage of rainwater, attracted flies, and started to accumulate mold.

Directors

See also
 California National Primate Research Center
 Oregon National Primate Research Center
 The Mind of an Ape
 Herpes B Virus
 Yerkish
 Ozzie (gorilla)

Notes

External links
 Emory.edu - Yerkes National Primate Research Center (official homepage)
 Emory.edu  - 'The Capuchin Library'
 All-Creatures.org - 'World Laboratory Animal Liberation Week (around April 24)...a national week of protests, media events, etc. at laboratories to stop testing and research on animals'
 IDAusa.org (pdf)  - 'Experiments Conducted on Macaque Monkeys:  Psychological Torment, Behavioral Research, Effects of Nonmaternal restraint on vocalizations of infant rhesus monkeys (Macaca Mulata)', T. Jovanovich, H. Gouzoues, In Defence of Animals Report: Yerkes Institute
 PrimateFreedom.com - 'Life in a Laboratory', Primate Freedom Project
 EmoryLies.com - 'Supporting Excellence in Research', Primate Freedom Project

 

Emory University
Medical research institutes in the United States
Scientific organizations established in 1930
Primate research centers
Research institutes in Georgia (state)
1930 establishments in Florida
Medical and health organizations based in Florida